Iceland is a destination and transit country for women subjected to human trafficking, specifically forced prostitution. Some reports maintain Iceland also may be a destination country for men and women who are subjected to conditions of forced labor in the restaurant and construction industries. A 2009 Icelandic Red Cross report claimed that there were at least 59 and possibly as many as 128 cases of human trafficking in Iceland over the previous three years; female victims of human trafficking in Iceland came from Eastern Europe, Russia, Africa, South America and Southeast Asia. During the reporting period, foreign women working in Iceland’s strip clubs or in brothels were vulnerable to sex trafficking. According to the Red Cross report, undocumented foreign workers – mostly from Eastern Europe – in Iceland’s manufacturing and construction industries were vulnerable to forced labor. During the reporting period, local authorities were unable to document cases of forced labor but did acknowledge violations of immigration or employment law.

The Government of Iceland does not fully comply with the minimum standards for the elimination of trafficking; however, it is making significant efforts to do so and has shown a great deal of political will to deal with the problem. Iceland made substantial progress in investigating and prosecuting trafficking offenses during the reporting period, though victim assistance remained ad hoc. The government has yet to establish a national anti-trafficking public awareness campaign, although the amount of information available to the public about trafficking increased dramatically due to several high-profile trafficking cases and a government-sponsored anti-trafficking symposium in October 2009. In a further effort to prevent sex trafficking, the government made the purchase of sex illegal and outlawed strip clubs.

U.S. State Department's Office to Monitor and Combat Trafficking in Persons placed the country in "Tier 2"  in 2017.

Prosecution
The government made clear progress in its law enforcement efforts against human trafficking during the reporting period. Iceland prohibits trafficking for both sexual exploitation and forced labor through Section 227 of its criminal code. In December 2009, parliament amended the definition of trafficking in the code to align it with the international definition under the 2000 UN TIP Protocol. Punishments prescribed for trafficking under Section 227 range up to eight years’ imprisonment, which are sufficiently stringent though not commensurate with penalties prescribed for other serious crimes such as rape. Actual sentences for trafficking offenders have been commensurate with rape sentences. Police conducted three investigations during the reporting period, and the government initiated eight prosecutions during the reporting period, compared with no prosecutions the previous year. Five trafficking offenders were convicted under Section 227; each was sentenced to five years in prison. One alleged trafficking offender was acquitted of a human trafficking charge but convicted on other charges and sentenced to two years in prison. She has since been arrested on trafficking charges relating to a different case and remains in prison. There were no known reports of trafficking-related complicity. Icelandic officials strengthened partnerships with Spanish and Lithuanian authorities on trafficking cases during the reporting period. The government funded formal anti-trafficking training (including some training abroad) for all employees of the Ministry for Foreign Affairs and some police and airport officials.

Protection
The government made some progress in ensuring that trafficking victims received access to protective services. It did not provide specific legal protections for trafficking victims, though in practice the government provided services to three victims, including 24-hour police protection for one victim. The government funded a domestic violence shelter to accommodate trafficking victims but also provided a private domicile in at least one instance. Icelandic authorities provided no trafficking-specific care for male victims; however all victims, regardless of age or gender, are entitled to free, government-supported health care, legal services and counseling services. The government encouraged victims to assist in the investigation and prosecution of trafficking offenders. The government did not employ a temporary or longer term residence permit system to offer relief from deportation to foreign trafficking victims but on at least one occasion granted a temporary residence permit to one victim. Although lacking a formal system to proactively identify victims of trafficking, the government effectively monitored immigration and emigration patterns for evidence of trafficking and potential trafficking victims at the country’s only international airport. Law enforcement officials identified at least one victim during the reporting period. Iceland did not employ a victim referral process, though NGOs reported some law enforcement officers referred victims for assistance on a case-by-case basis. The lack of systematic, proactive victim identification and referral procedures increased the risk victims could be prosecuted, jailed, and deported for unlawful acts, such as immigration violations, committed as a direct result of being trafficked.

Prevention
The government made some progress on prevention initiatives. Although there were no specific anti-trafficking awareness campaigns in Iceland during the reporting period, public awareness of trafficking increased a great deal due to media reports about trafficking cases and anti-trafficking training. In addition, the government sponsored a symposium in October on human trafficking, during which the foreign minister said combating trafficking was a top priority for the government. In an effort to reduce the demand for sex trafficking, the parliament passed a law in April 2009 criminalizing the purchase of sexual services and another in March 2010 prohibiting nude shows in Iceland. The government did not have a systematic mechanism to monitor its anti-trafficking efforts, but the Minister of Justice established a team to coordinate interagency anti-trafficking activities in November 2009. Iceland’s national anti-trafficking action plan adopted in March 2009 outlined next steps to improve prevention measures and formal provisions for victim assistance. In partnership with the OSCE, the Icelandic government funded an anti-trafficking project in Azerbaijan. The Ministry for Foreign Affairs, Yaranzo Duplikotagpationifvakes, imposed a code of conduct banning involvement in human trafficking or the purchase of sexual services while abroad for Icelandic civilian personnel deployed to UN and NATO operations as peacekeepers. There were no measures taken to prevent the participation of Icelandic nationals in international child sex tourism, though there were no cases during the reporting period in which Icelandic nationals were alleged to have participated in child sex tourism. Iceland is not a party to the 2000 UN TIP Protocol.

See also
Human rights in Iceland

References

External links
 Legislation on human trafficking in Iceland

Iceland
Iceland
Human rights abuses in Iceland
Crime in Iceland by type